Coronodon is a genus of toothed mysticetes from the Early Oligocene Ashley Formation of South Carolina.

Description
The rostrum of Coronodon is wide, judging by its straight sides and short mandibular symphysis. Despite being similar to some archaeocetes in having a rostrum that is twisted counterclockwise in anterior view, it differs in having posterior teeth with subequal cusps and an upturned anterior process of the maxilla. Coronodon differs from other toothed mysticetes in having anterior lower molars labially overlapping posterior lower molars.

Phylogeny
Coronodon falls basally within Mysticeti, being closely related to the unnamed taxon ChM PV 5720 and more primitive than "Metasqualodon" symmetricus, Aetiocetidae, Mammalodontidae, and Llanocetus.

References

Prehistoric cetacean genera
Fossil taxa described in 2017
Oligocene cetaceans